Melchiorre da Montalbano was an Italian architect and sculptor, active in the 13th century in the region of Basilicata.

Details of his life are few. He is said to have been born in Montalbano, and worked under or with Bartolomeo da Foggia. He was one of the major sculptors in the region at that time, along with Mele da Stigliano and Sàrolo da Muro. He operated at a time of change from Romanesque to Gothic styles, and reflected the latter style.

Among his works in Basilicata are:
 Relief tiles of Pronaos, Anglona Cathedral
 Column capitals  palazzo comunale, Atella
 Portal, Santa Maria del Piano, Calvello
 Portal and Architrave, San Gianuario, Marsico Nuovo
 Portal, San Michele Arcangelo, Marsico Nuovo
 Relief tiles depicting Abraham, Matera Cathedral 
 Portal and pilasters, Rapolla Cathedral
 Portalino, San Pietro, Tolve

References

13th-century Italian sculptors
Italian male sculptors
13th-century Italian architects
People from Basilicata